The Mali national under-16 and under-17 basketball team is a national basketball team of Mali, governed by the Fédération Malienne de Basketball. It represents the country in international under-16 and under-17 (under age 16 and under age 17) basketball competitions.

World Cup record

References

B
Men's national under-17 basketball teams